The Marshall 22 is an American trailerable sailboat that was designed by Breckenridge Marshall as a cruiser and first built in 1965.

Production
The design is built by Marshall Marine Corporation in South Dartmouth, Massachusetts, United States. Production started in 1965 and the design remains in production. Nearly 800 have been built.

Design
The Marshall 22 is a recreational keelboat, built predominantly of fiberglass, with wood trim. It has a catboat gaff rig or optionally a fractional sloop rig, a plumb stem, a vertical transom, a transom-hung rudder controlled by a wheel and a fixed keel with a centerboard. It displaces  and carries  of ballast.

The catboat version has simple rigging with only a forestay on the mast and the mainsheet for controlling the sail. Factory standard equipment includes a boat hook, fog horn, fire extinguisher and life jackets.

Accommodation includes a settee on the port side of the bow and a starboard settee slightly aft. The galley is in the main cabin on the port side, while the head is on the forward starboard side. The main cabin has a drop-leaf table that is mounted on the centerboard trunk. The bow cabin has two ports and the main cabin has four.

The cat-rigged version of the design has a PHRF racing average handicap of 279 with a high of 246 and low of 350.

Operational history
In a review in Sailing Magazine, David Liscio, wrote, "these boats seem to exude a simple elegance".

In a 2010 review Steve Henkel wrote, "The Marshall 22 catboat and her sloop-rigged sister have been in production for over 40 years—one of the longest running continuously produced cruising sailboat designs ever. During the period, understandably, the builder has made many changes. Gasoline engines have been replaced with diesels, horsepower ratings have crept up, interior layout has been modified ... and fit and finish have gone through several iterations (generally toward fancier wood trim). Still, the Marshall 22 remains essentially the same boat it was in 1965, featuring shallow draft (two feet with board up) for gunkholing or lying on the bottom at low tide, and a good length on deck for a catboat. (Hoisting the sail on a bigger cat can be a pain for a singlehander—and a smaller cat has a lot less space below.) Best features: she looks like the pretty Cape Cod cat she is; skippers are likely to get frequent compliments while cruising. There's a good network of other catboaters, especially in the northeastern states for those seeking nautical camaraderie. Worst features: Compared to her comps, headroom is low. Also: the Marshall 22 cat has a reputation for being a bit sluggish in light air; well-sailed Marshall 18s can beat her handily. The sloop rig (338 sq. ft. main, 100 sq. ft. jib) is even slower Both rigs are better when it breezes up."

See also

List of sailing boat types

Similar sailboats
Alberg 22
Cape Dory 22
Capri 22
Catalina 22
CS 22
DS-22
Edel 665
Falmouth Cutter 22
Hunter 22
J/22
Marlow-Hunter 22
Nonsuch 22
Pearson Electra
Pearson Ensign
Santana 22
Seaward 22
Spindrift 22
Starwind 223
Tanzer 22
US Yachts US 22

References

External links

Keelboats
1960s sailboat type designs
Sailing yachts
Trailer sailers
Sailboat type designs by Breckenridge Marshall
Sailboat types built by Marshall Marine Corporation